Ronald Jackson Jr. (born May 2, 1997) is an American professional basketball player for Basket Torino of the A2 - Lega Nazionale Pallacanestro. He played college basketball for North Carolina A&T after transferring from Hillsborough Community College.

High school career
Jackson attended Fleming Island High School in Fleming Island, Florida. He tried out for his high school basketball team as a junior but was cut. He ended up making the team as a senior.

College career
Jackson walked on to the basketball team at Hillsborough Community College as a redshirt-freshman. As a sophomore, Jackson averaged 13.5 points and 10.5 rebounds per game. He transferred to North Carolina A&T after coach Willie Jones noticed him at a camp and reviewed his footage from Hillsborough. He averaged 7.5 points and 4.6 rebounds per game as a junior. On February 17, 2020, Jackson scored a career-high 28 points and collected eight rebounds in a 77–60 win over North Carolina Central. As a senior, Jackson averaged 15.0 points and 10.4 rebounds per game, earning first-team All-MEAC honors.  He was named MEAC defensive player of the week on two occasions and finished second in the conference with 15 double-doubles during his senior season.

Professional career
On July 20, 2020, Jackson signed with BG Göttingen of the Basketball Bundesliga. He subsequently joined Instituto Atlético Central Córdoba of La Liga Argentina de Básquet, averaging 8.0 points and 4.5 rebounds per game. On August 17, 2021, Jackson signed with KK Rogaška of the Premier A Slovenian Basketball League.

Personal life
Jackson is the son of Ronald and Ellen Jackson. His father served in the United States Marine Corps for 21 years, and his mother was also in the Corps. Jackson's grandmother died from cancer in October 2013. His mother died from multiple sclerosis in 2016.

References

External links
North Carolina A&T Aggies bio

1997 births
Living people
American expatriate basketball people in Argentina
American expatriate basketball people in Germany
American men's basketball players
Basketball players from Florida
Hillsborough Hawks men's basketball players
North Carolina A&T Aggies men's basketball players
People from Clay County, Florida
Power forwards (basketball)